Kunesh was a village (now an unincorporated community) around the crossroads between sections 21, 22, 27 and 28, in the Town of Pittsfield, Brown County, Wisconsin, United States.

History
A post office was established March 8, 1894 and named for George Kunesh (1864–1924), the first postmaster. It was discontinued on August 14, 1905. Kunesh, who was born in Bohemia, was naturalized in 1889; he was the son of Jan (John) and Dorota (Dora) Kuneš, who emigrated to the United States from Bohemia and farmed in Kewaunee County.

References

Unincorporated communities in Brown County, Wisconsin
Unincorporated communities in Wisconsin
Green Bay metropolitan area